Nationality words link to articles with information on the nation's poetry or literature (for instance, Irish or France).

Events
 About this time Thomas Seaton established the Seatonian Prize at Cambridge University for religious poetry

Works published

Great Britain
 Geoffrey Chaucer, The Canterbury Tales of Chaucer, posthumous edition edited by George Ogle
 Stephen Duck, Every Man in his Own Way
 Thomas Francklin, Of the Nature of the Gods, anonymously published translation from the Latin of Cicero's De natura deorum
 Sarah Parsons Moorhead, "Lines [. . .] Dedicated to the Rev. Mr. George Tennent", sharply criticizes the clergyman; English Colonial American
 Robert Nugent, 1st Earl Nugent, An Ode to Mankind, published anonymously
 William Shenstone, The Judgment of Hercules
 Leonard Welsted, The Summum Bonum; or, Wistest Philosophy
 John Wesley and Charles Wesley, A Collection of Psalms and Hymns (see also Hymns and Sacred Poems 1739)
 William Whitehead, The Danger of Writing Verse

Other
 Johann Jakob Bodmer, Kritische Betrachtungen über die poetischen Gemählde der Dichter a German-language critical treatise published in Switzerland

Births
Death years link to the corresponding "[year] in poetry" article:
 March 25 – Daniel Schiebeler (died 1771)  German writer and poet
 April 11 – Johann Heinrich Merck (died 1791), German critic, essayist, editor, writer and poet
 November 15 – Johann Kaspar Lavater (died 1801), Swiss clergyman, philosopher, writer and poet

Deaths
Birth years link to the corresponding "[year] in poetry" article:
 March 17 – Jean-Baptiste Rousseau, French poet (born 1671)

See also

 Poetry
 List of years in poetry
 List of years in literature
 18th century in poetry
 18th century in literature
 Augustan poetry
 Scriblerus Club

Notes

18th-century poetry
Poetry